UFC Fight Night: Condit vs. Kampmann 2 (also known as UFC Fight Night 27) was a mixed martial arts event held on August 28, 2013, at the Bankers Life Fieldhouse in Indianapolis, Indiana. The event was broadcast live on Fox Sports 1.

Background
The main event was a rematch between Martin Kampmann and former UFC Interim Welterweight Champion and former WEC Welterweight Champion Carlos Condit.  In their first encounter at UFC Fight Night 18 in 2009, Kampmann defeated Condit (who was making his promotional debut) via split decision.

A bout between promotional newcomers Nandor Guelmino and Derrick Lewis was briefly linked to this event.  However, Lewis was forced out of the bout with an injury and Guelmino was removed from the card and scheduled for a later bout at UFC 165.

A bout between Bobby Voelker and James Head was briefly scheduled for this event.  However, on July 11, it was announced that Voelker had been brought in as a replacement for Siyar Bahadurzada and would face Robbie Lawler on July 27, 2013 at UFC on Fox 8. Jason High stepped in to face Head as a replacement for Voelker.

Paulo Thiago was expected to face Kelvin Gastelum at the event.  However, Thiago pulled out of the bout citing a knee injury and was replaced by Brian Melancon.

Sarah Kaufman was expected to face Sara McMann at the event.  However, McMann pulled out of the bout for undisclosed personal reasons.  As a result, Kaufmann was pulled from the event as well.

A flyweight bout between UFC newcomers Dustin Ortiz and Justin Scoggins was briefly linked to this event, but was removed from the card.

Results

Bonus awards
The following fighters were awarded $50,000 bonuses.

Fight of the Night: Carlos Condit vs. Martin Kampmann
Knockout of the Night: Brandon Thatch
Submission of the Night: Zak Cummings

See also
List of UFC events
2013 in UFC

References

UFC Fight Night
2013 in mixed martial arts
Mixed martial arts in Indiana
Sports competitions in Indianapolis
2013 in sports in Indiana
Events in Indianapolis